This page covers all relevant details regarding Dunav Ruse for all official competitions inside the 2018–19 season. These are the First Professional Football League and the Bulgarian Cup.

Transfers

In

Out

Loans in

Loans out

Current squad 
As of 9 March 2019

Foreign players

EU Nationals
 Dragoș Firțulescu

EU Nationals (Dual citizenship)

Non-EU Nationals
 Samuel Inkoom
  Aleksandar Isaevski
 Mouhamadou N'Diaye

Squad statistics

|}

Competitions

Overall

Competition record
{| class="wikitable" style="text-align: center"
|-
! rowspan="2" style="width:100px;"| Competition
! rowspan="2" style="width:90px;"| Started round
! rowspan="2" style="width:90px;"| Current position/round
! rowspan="2" style="width:90px;"| Final position/round
! rowspan="2" style="width:130px;"| First match
! rowspan="2" style="width:110px;"| Last match
! colspan="8" | Record
|-
! style="width:25px;"| P
! style="width:25px;"| W
! style="width:25px;"| D
! style="width:25px;"| L
! style="width:25px;"| GF
! style="width:25px;"| GA
! style="width:25px;"| GD
! style="width:40px;"| Win %
|-

|-

|-
! colspan="6" style="text-align: right;"| Total

|-

Friendlies

Pre-season

Mid-season

Winter

First Professional League

Regular season

Matches

Results summary

League performance

League table

Relegation stage

Matches

Relegation play-offs

Results summary

League performance

League table

Bulgarian Cup

References

FC Dunav Ruse seasons
Dunav Ruse